Reykjavík International School (RIS) was a small private international school for students from Year 1 to Year 11 in Reykjavík, Iceland. The primary language of instruction was English. Students studied Icelandic as well, whether as beginners or native speakers with good comprehension of the language. It accepted children from five to sixteen years old from all nationalities throughout the world.

The school ran for three years, from 2014–2017. It had 23 students in 2014 and 7 students in 2015.

A short lived school by the same name existed in 2004.

Accreditation 
Reykjavík International School was accredited by the Icelandic Ministry of Education, Science and Culture. The school is a part of the umbrella association of independent schools in Iceland. Additionally, RIS was accredited by the independent accreditation agency the New England Association of Schools and Colleges (NEASC) and the Commission on International Education (CIE).

RIS is a member of the Nordic Network of International Schools, an organization that was established in 1997 to serve international schools in the Nordic and Baltic regions. The school hosted the 2016 Nordic Network annual Leadership Conference and AGM.

History 
RIS was an educational and cultural foundation run by an elected board of trustees elected on a representative council meeting. The RIS Foundation was established in March 2014 and consisted of a team of professional advisors with expertise in a variety of disciplines.

In October 2015, the Reykjavík International School was visited by the Ambassador of China, His Excellency Zhang Weidong. He took part in the weekly Chinese lesson with the school's Beijing based teacher and also spoke to the children about the Chinese language, such as how to say "how are you" and "my name is," as well as how the Chinese use characters to write rather than an alphabet.

On April 19, 2016, RIS was visited by Mayor Mr. Dagur B. Eggertsson, who greeted students and staff at the school.

The RIS school logo was designed by Unnur Valdís & Einar Gylfason at Leynivopnid. It was inspired by the ancient Chinese puzzle Tangram.

Curriculum 
The curriculum was derived from incorporating key components and objectives of the national curricula of England, Iceland, and Singapore. Students also studied extra-curricular activities such as swimming, art, computer programming, drama, textiles, and more.

References

Educational institutions established in 2014
2014 establishments in Iceland
Educational institutions disestablished in 2017
2017 disestablishments in Iceland
Education in Reykjavík
International schools in Iceland